Laurent Fauchier (1643–1672) was a French portrait painter.

Biographie 
Laurent Fauchier was born in Aix-en-Provence, rue de la Sabaterie (today called rue Laurent Fauchier). He was the son of Balthazar Fauchier and Anne Marguerite Chanvre who were married in 1638.

He became a pupil of Bernadin Mimault for three years, where he probably met his later teacher Pierre Mignard and his later pupil Pierre Puget. In 1664 he became a portrait painter with his own workshop and was awarded a commission by the city council for 66 portraits which he did not finish.

Réferences 

1643 births
1672 deaths
Artists from Aix-en-Provence
17th-century French painters
French male painters